Pesek may refer to:

 Pesek, a village near Križevci, Croatia
 Pesek, a community in the municipality of San Dorligo della Valle, Italy
 Pesek and Pesek Kechil, former islands now part of Jurong Island, Singapore
 Pesek Zman, an Israeli brand of chocolate snacks

People:
 Pešek, a Czech surname
 Beatrix Pesek, Hungarian ten-pin bowler
 John Pesek (1894–1978), American wrestler